This is a list of women artists who were born in Spain or whose artworks are closely associated with that country.

A
Eulalia Abaitua Allende-Salazar (1853–1943), photographer
Laia Abril (born 1986), photographer and writer
Pilar Albarracín (born 1968), performance artist, installation artist, photographer
Julia Alcayde y Montoya (1885–1939), painter
Edith Alonso (born 1974), sound artist
Begoña Ameztoy (born 1951), writer and painter
Olga Andrino (born 1955), painter, sculptor
Lola Anglada (1893–1984), writer and illustrator
Elena Asins (1940–2015), visual artist and writer
Pilar Aymerich i Puig (born 1943), photographer and photojournalist

B
Carmen Babiano Méndez-Núñez (1852–1914), painter
Isabel Bacardit (born 1960), painter
Elena Bajo (born 1976), contemporary artist
Antonia Bañuelos (1879–1926), painter
Carmen Barbará (born 1933), comics artist and illustrator
María Blanchard (1881–1932), painter
Elena Blasco (born 1950), multidisciplinary artist
Paula Bonet (born 1980), book illustrator and painter
Elena Brockmann (1867–1946), historical painter
Encarnación Bustillo Salomón (1876–1960), painter

C
Lita Cabellut (born 1961), painter based in The Hague
Carmen Calvo (born 1950), conceptual artist
Purita Campos (1937–2019), cartoonist, illustrator and painter
Esperanza Elena Caro (1906–1985), embroiderer
Maria Luisa Carranque y Bonavía (18th century), pastellist
Yolanda Castaño (born 1977), painter, literary critic and poet
Rosana Castrillo Diaz (born 1971), drawer, sculptor, installation artist
Carolina Ceca (born 1979), contemporary artist and art historian based in Tokyo 
Mari Chordà (born 1942), painter, poet, feminist
La Chunga (born c. 1938), flamenco dancer, painter
Colita pseudonym of Isabel Steva i Hernández (born 1940), photographer
Ana Corbero (born 1961), painter, sculptor
Adelina Covián, contemporary painter
Ángel María Cortellini (1819–1887), painter
Angela de la Cruz (born 1965), artist
Irene Cruz (born 1987), photographer

D
María Dávila (born 1990), contemporary painter
Isabel de Santiago (1666–1714), colonial painter
Dora Dolz (1941–2008), painter, sculptor, ceramist
Patricia Dauder, multidisciplinary artist

E
Ende (10th century), manuscript illuminator
Miriam Escofet (born 1967), portrait painter, now in England

F
María Ángeles Fernández Cuesta (born 1950), outsider artist
Patricia Fernández (born 1980), artist based in Los Angeles
Asunción Ferrer y Crespí (died 1818), painter
Esther Ferrer (born 1937), interdisciplinary artist, educator
Alicia Framis (fl. from late 1990s), contemporary artist
Fernanda Frances Arribas (1862–1939), still life and flower painter
Victoria Francés (born 1982), illustrator

G
Menchu Gal (1919–2008), painter
Rosa Galcerán (1917–2015), cartoonist, advertising artist and poet
Sofía Gandarias (1957–2016), painter
Cristina García Rodero (born 1949), photographer
Dora García (born 1965), contemporary artist
Elvira Gascón (1911–2000), painter, engraver
Alejandrina Gessler y Lacroix (1831–1907), painter
Adela Ginés y Ortiz (1847–1923), painter
Ana González (born 1970), fashion designer
Marisa Gonzalez (born 1945), multimedia artist

H
Bárbara María Hueva (1733–1772), painter
María Juana Hurtado de Mendoza (died 1818), painter

I
Cristina Iglesias (born 1956), installation artist and sculptor

J
Concha Jerez (born 1941), pioneer in conceptual art
Carmen Jiménez (1920–2016), painter, sculptor, academic
Ana Juan (born 1961), illustrator, painter

L
Carmen Laffón (1934–2021), figurative painter and sculptor
Lalalimola (born 1984), illustrator
Ouka Leele (born 1957), photographer
Francesca Llopis (born 1956), mixed media artist
Jil Love (fl. 2012), public performance art

M
Maruja Mallo (1902–1995), painter
Anna Manel·la (1950–2019), sculptor and painter
Inka Martí (born 1964), journalist, writer and photographer
Cristina Martín Lara (born 1972), photographer
María Teresa Martín-Vivaldi (born 1955), painter and engraver
Francisca Efigenia Meléndez y Durazzo (1770–1825), miniaturist and pastellist
María Mencía (fl. from 1999), media artist
Cristina de Middel (born 1975), documentary photographer
Isabel Muñoz (born 1951), photographer
Paloma Muñoz (born 1965), photographer, visual artist

N
Nath-Sakura (born 1973), photographer
Paloma Navares (active since the 1980s), interdisciplinary artist
Eva Navarro (born 1967), painter
Pilar Nouvilas i Garrigolas (1854-1938), painter 
Marina Núñez (born 1966), painter and academic

O
Josefa de Óbidos (1630–1684), Spanish-born Portuguese painter
Elena Odriozola (born 1967), illustrator of books for children and young adults
Ana Oncina (born 1989), comic book illustrator and writer
Cris Ortega (born 1980), painter, writer and comics artist
Cristina Otero (born 1995), photographer

P
Marta Palau Bosch (born 1934), Spanish-born tapestry and visual artist now based in Mexico
Pepita Pardell (1928–2019), animator, cartoonist, illustrator and painter
Ester Partegàs (born 1972), contemporary artist, now in New York
Maria Pascual Alberich (1933–2011), illustrator
María Luisa Pérez Herrero (1898–1934), painter
Adriana Petit (born 1984), multidisciplinary artist
Pepa Poch (born 1960), artist
Núria Pompeia (1931–2016), cartoonist and writer
Silvia Prada (active since 2002), illustrator, decorative artist, now in New York

Q
Nuria Quevedo (born 1938), painter and graphic artist
Isabel Quintanilla (1938–2017), visual artist

R
Regina Raull (1928–2019), Spanish-born Mexican painter
Moon Ribas (born 1985), avant-garde artist
Lua Ribeira (born 1986), photographer
Fina Rifà (fl. 1963), children's artist, illustrator
María Luisa de la Riva y Callol-Muñoz (1865–1926), painter
Luisa Roldán (1652–1706), Spain's first female Baroque sculptor
Covadonga Romero Rodríguez (1917–2018), sculptor and painter

S
Olga Sacharoff (1889‒1967), Georgian-born Spanish Surrealist painter
Matilde Salvador i Segarra (1918–2007), composer, painter
Isabel de Santiago (1666–c. 1714), Quito-born Spanish painter specializing in the Virgin and baby Jesus
Ángeles Santos Torroella (1911–2013), Surrealist painter
Susana Solano (born 1946), sculptor
Carme Solé Vendrell (born 1944), illustrator
Elena Sorolla (1895–1975), sculptor and painter
Francesca Stuart Sindici (1858–c. 1929), Spanish-Italian painter

T
Josefina Tanganelli Plana (1904–1966), cartoonist and painter
Josefa Teixidor i Torres (1875–1914), Catalan painter
María Teresa Torras (1927–2009), Spanish-Venezuelan artist specializing in sculpture, textiles and metalwork
Manuela Trasobares (born 1962), artist, opera singer, politician

U
Amalia Ulman (born 1989), Argentinian-born Spanish artist now based in Los Angeles, USA
Carmina Useros (1928–2017), writer, ceramist and painter

V
Remedios Varo Uranga (1908–1963), Spanish-Mexican para-surrealist painter
Dolors Vázquez Aznar (1955–2014), realist painter and lawyer
Lluïsa Vidal i Puig (1876–1918), Catalan painter

W
Rosario Weiss Zorrilla (1814–1843), painter and exgraver, known for portraits

Y
Hisae Yanase (1943–2019), Japanese-born ceramist, based in Córdoba
Puri Yáñez (born 1936), surrealist painter

W
Rosario Weiss Zorrilla (1814–1843), painter and engraver

References 

-
Spanish women artists, List of
Artists
Artists